The Western Pennsylvania League was a Class D level minor league baseball league consisting of teams based in Pennsylvania, West Virginia and Maryland that played during the 1907 season.

History

The Class D level Western Pennsylvania League began the 1907 season with eight teams. The Beaver Falls Beavers, Butler White Sox, Clarksburg Bees, Connellsville Cokers, Fairmont Champions, Greensburg Red Sox, Scottdale Giants and the Latrobe, Pennsylvania team were charter members.

On May 28, 1907, the Latrobe team was forfeited to the league. The Cumberland Rooters took its place, but that team moved to Piedmont, West Virginia on June 27, then to Somerset, Pennsylvania on July 11. It eventually folded altogether later that month. On August 1, the Kittanning Infants entered the league, but disbanded, along with Beaver Falls, on August 11, 1907. Greensburg disbanded on August 25, 1907. Fairmont finished in first place with a 68–36 record. Jim Clark, Dick Hoblitzell and Reddy Mack played in the league.

A league by the same name existed in the late 1889.

1907 Western Pennsylvania League standings
 The Latrobe (7–10) franchise was forfeited to the league May 28. The league then awarded it to Cumberland. Cumberland (5–20) moved to Piedmont (4–6) June 27, then to Somerset (0–5) July 11. It disbanded later that month.Kittanning entered the league August 1.  Beaver Falls and Kittanning withdrew August 11.   Greensburg disbanded August 25

References

 
Defunct baseball leagues in the United States
Baseball leagues in Pennsylvania
Sports leagues established in 1907
1907 establishments in Pennsylvania
Sports leagues disestablished in 1907
1907 disestablishments in Pennsylvania
Defunct minor baseball leagues in the United States
Baseball leagues in West Virginia
Baseball leagues in Maryland